The false papillose blenny (Acanthemblemaria greenfieldi) is a species of chaenopsid blenny found in coral reefs in the western Atlantic ocean. The specific name honours the American ichthyologist David W. Greenfield who identified this species a something new but gave his material to the authors.

References

greenfieldi
Fish of Honduras
Fish of the Caribbean
false papillose blenny